A variable- (also changeable-, electronic-, or dynamic-) message sign or message board, often abbreviated VMS, VMB, CMS, or DMS, and in the UK known as a matrix sign,
is an electronic traffic sign often used on roadways to give travelers information about special events. Such signs warn of traffic congestion, accidents, incidents such as terrorist attacks, AMBER/Silver/Blue Alerts, roadwork zones, or speed limits on a specific highway segment. In urban areas, VMS are used within parking guidance and information systems to guide drivers to available car parking spaces. They may also ask vehicles to take alternative routes, limit travel speed, warn of duration and location of the incidents, inform of the traffic conditions, or display general public safety messages.

History

VMS systems were deployed at least as early as the 1950s on the New Jersey Turnpike. The NJ Turnpike's signs of that period, and up to around 2012, were capable of displaying a few messages in neon, all oriented around warning drivers to slow down: "REDUCE SPEED", followed by a warning of either construction, accident, congestion, ice, snow, or fog at a certain distance ahead. The New Jersey Turnpike Authority replaced those signs (along with 1990s-vintage dot-matrix VMS systems along the Garden State Parkway) with more flexible electronic signs between 2010 and 2016.

The current VMS systems are largely deployed on freeways, trunk highways, or in work zones.

On the interchange of I-5 and SR 120 in San Joaquin County, California, an automated visibility and speed warning system was installed in 1996 to warn traffic of reduced visibility due to fog (where tule fog is a common problem in the winter), and of slow or stopped traffic.

Message Signs were deployed in Ontario during the 1990s and are now being upgraded on 400-series highways as well as two pilot secondary highways in northeastern Ontario.

Technologies and types
Early variable message signs included static signs with words that would illuminate (often using neon tubing) indicating the type of incident that occurred, or signs that used rotating prisms (trilons) to change the message being displayed. These were later replaced by dot matrix displays typically using eggcrate, fiber optic, or flip-disc technology, which were capable of displaying a much wider range of messages than earlier static variable message signs. Since the late 1990s, the most common technology used in new installations for variable message signs are LED displays. In recent years, some newer LED variable message signs have the ability to display colored text and graphics.

Dot-matrix variable message signs are divided into three subgroups: character matrix, row matrix, and full matrix. In a character matrix VMS, each character is given its own matrix with equal horizontal spacing between them, typically with two or three rows of characters. In a full matrix VMS, the entire sign is a single large dot matrix display, allowing the display of different fonts and graphics. A row matrix VMS is a hybrid of the two types, divided into two or three rows like a character matrix display, except each row is a single long dot matrix display instead of being split per character horizontally.

Overhead variable message signs are today available in three form factors: front access, rear access, and walk-in. In a front access variable message sign, maintenance is performed by lifting the sign open from the front. Most smaller VMS are of the front access form factor, and are typically installed today on major arterials. The rear access form factor is similar to the front access form factor, except that maintenance is performed from the rear of the sign, and are commonly used for medium-sized dynamic message signs installed along the roadside of freeways (instead of overhead). The walk-in form factor is a more recent introduction, where maintenance on the sign is performed from the inside of the sign. A key advantage of the walk-in form factor is that lane closures are generally not required to perform maintenance on the sign. Most of the largest VMS units installed today are walk-in units, and are typically installed overhead on freeways.

The NJ Turnpike Authority counts five unique types of variable message signs under its jurisdiction, at least one of which has been replaced by newer signs. They are:

"REDUCE SPEED" neon signs (1950s-2010, obsolete, have been replaced).
"Changeable message signs" (trilon/ rotating-drum signs that can be used for closing roads or moving traffic to other roadways).
Electronic VMS: signs with remotely controlled messages displayed on them; the messages are sent from the State Traffic Management Center, updating the signs automatically.
Variable speed limit signs - used for varying the posted speed limits within work zones and in emergencies.
Portable VMS: movable "electronic VMS". A portable VMS has much the same characteristics as a fixed electronic VMS, but can be moved from location to location as the need dictates.

Usage

Early models required an operator to be physically present when programming a message, whereas newer models may be reprogrammed remotely via a wired or wireless network or cellphone connection.

A complete message on a panel generally includes a problem statement indicating incident, roadwork, stalled vehicle etc.; a location statement indicating where the incident is located; an effect statement indicating lane closure, delay, etc. and an action statement giving suggestion what to do traffic conditions ahead. These signs are also used for AMBER Alert messages, and in some states, Silver and Blue Alert messages.

In some places, VMSes are set up with permanent, semi-static displays indicating predicted travel times to important traffic destinations such as major cities or interchanges along the route of a highway.

Typical messages provide the following information:

Promotional messages about services provided by a road authority during non-critical hours, such as carpooling efforts, travelers' information stations and 5-1-1 lines
Crashes, including vehicle spin-out or rollover
Road Works
Incidents affecting normal traffic flow in a lane or on shoulders
Non-recurring congestion, often a residual effect of cleared crash
Closures of an entire road, e.g. over a mountain pass in winter.
Exit ramp closures
Debris on roadway
Vehicle fires
Wildfires
Short-term maintenance or construction lasting less than three days
Pavement failure alerts
AMBER, Silver, and Blue Alerts, as well as weather warnings via the warning infrastructure of NOAA Weather Radio's SAME system
Travel times
Variable speed limits
Car park occupancy levels
speed sign, for recommending a speed to approach the next traffic light in its green phase.

The information comes from a variety of traffic monitoring and surveillance systems. It is expected that by providing real-time information on special events on the oncoming road, VMS can improve motorists' route selection, reduce travel time, mitigate the severity and duration of incidents and improve the performance of the transportation network.

* Do not enter the motorway when the red lamps are flashing in pairs from side to side

Movable versions

Truck-mounted VMSes (also called Portable Changeable Message Signs or PCMS) are sometimes dispatched by highway agencies such as Caltrans to warn traffic of incidents such as accidents in areas where permanent VMSes aren't available or near enough as a preventive measure for reducing secondary accidents. They are often deployed in pairs so that the second VMS truck can take over when the traffic queue overtakes the first truck, requiring the first truck to reposition further upstream from the queue, to be effective. An optional third truck, the team leader, may be utilized for driving by and monitoring the incident itself, traffic patterns and delay times, to make strategic decisions for minimizing delays—analogous to spotter planes used in fighting forest fires.

Trailer-mounted variable-message signs are used to alter traffic patterns near work zones, and for traffic management for special events, natural disasters, and other temporary traffic patterns. The messages displayed on the sign can be programmed locally on the unit's control panel, or units equipped with a cellular modem can be programmed remotely via computer or phone. Most manufacturers produce trailers which comply with the National Transportation Communications for Intelligent Transportation System Protocol (NTCIP) which allows the portable trailer to be integrated with an intelligent transportation system. Trailer-mounted VMS can be equipped with radar, cameras, and other sensing devices as part of a smart work zone deployment..

In popular culture
A variable-message sign figures significantly into the plot of the 1991 film L.A. Story.

Gallery

See also
 Flip-disc display
 gantry (transport)
 Glossary of road transport terms
 Passenger information system
 Radar speed sign

References

External links

 Changeable Message Sign Operation and Messaging Handbook. Operations Office of Travel Management, Federal Highway Administration, August 2004. Retrieved 2009-12-07.
 Chapter 2L: Changeable Message Signs. U.S. Manual on Uniform Traffic Control Devices, 2009 ed. with Revisions 1 and 2.

Traffic signs
Intelligent transportation system sensor
Digital media